Juan Carlos Anderson Munz (9 January 1913 – 12 September 2005) was an Argentinian athlete who competed in the 1936 Summer Olympics. He reached the semi-finals of the 400 metres and finished fifth, after coming second in both the heats and the quarter-finals. He had more success in the 800 metres: reaching the final and coming seventh. After winning his heat he received a bye, meaning he did not have to compete in the quarter-final. He finished third in the semi-final.


Times

400m
Heat - 49.4
QF - 48.7
SF - 48.5

800m
Heat - 1:55.1
SF - 1:54.8
Final - ?

References

Olympic athletes of Argentina
Argentine male sprinters
Athletes (track and field) at the 1936 Summer Olympics
1913 births
2005 deaths
Athletes from Buenos Aires
20th-century Argentine people